Urana Shire was a local government area in the Riverina region of New South Wales, Australia. The Newell Highway crosses its north-west corner. The Shire included the town of Urana and the small towns of Boree Creek, Morundah, Oaklands and Rand.

The last mayor of Urana Shire was Cr. Patrick Bourke an unaligned politician.

Amalgamation
Following an independent review, on 12 May 2016 the Minister for Local Government announced that the merger with the Corowa Shire would proceed with immediate effect to form the Federation Council.

Council

Composition and election method
At the time of dissolution, Urana Shire Council was composed of nine councillors elected proportionally as three separate wards, each electing three councillors. All councillors were elected for a fixed four-year term of office. The mayor was elected by the councillors at the first meeting of the council. The last election was held on 8 September 2012. In the B and C Wards, only three candidates, being those below, nominated for election. There being no additional candidates, the election for these Wards was uncontested. In the A Ward, an election was held.

See also
 Riverina Water County Council

References

External links

Former local government areas of New South Wales
2016 disestablishments in Australia
Newell Highway